Nettlestead is a dispersed village and civil parish in the Mid Suffolk district of Suffolk in eastern England.The surrounding villages of Nettlestead include Somersham (the closest), Little Blakenham, Baylham, Barking, Willisham and Offton.

In Nettlestead there are two manors: The Chace and High Hall.

The originally the manor belonged to the Earls of Richmond; passed to Peter II, Count of Savoy, Robert de Tiptoft, the Despencers and the Wentworths; and gave to the last the title of Baron. Nettlestead Hall (the Chace) was the Manor-house which retains an ancient gateway, bearing the arms of the Wentworths. From the 13th to the 16th centuries the Nettlestead families were patrons of the house of friars minor at Ipswich.

High Hall dates back to the 16th Century and was built by Huguenots who had fled from France during series of religious persecutions.

Located to the north-west of Ipswich and 11 miles from Stowmarket, in 2005 its population was 90.

Notable residents
John Bois (1560-1643), scholar, and member of the translating committee for the 1611 King James Version of the Bible.

References

External links

Villages in Suffolk
Civil parishes in Suffolk
Mid Suffolk District